Hyllus is a genus of the spider family Salticidae (jumping spiders). Most species occur in Africa and Madagascar, with many in Australasia and north to India. H. insularis is found in Greece and Iran, but it is considered misplaced in this genus, and is now Evarcha insularis.

Description 
They are medium to large spiders, commonly mistaken by those in the genus Evarcha. They are usually stout, hairy and dully colored. They usually have horns at the top of the median eyes formed by long bristles. They have a rounded carapace, which is larger than the eye field. Those in the genus Evarcha are usually smaller and their carapace is thinner.

Name
Hyllus was the son of Heracles and Deianira in Greek mythology.

Species
, the World Spider Catalog accepted these species:

Hyllus acutus (Blackwall, 1877) – Comoro Islands, Seychelles
Hyllus aegyptiacus (Denis, 1947) – Egypt
Hyllus africanus Lessert, 1927 – Congo basin
Hyllus albofasciatus Thorell, 1899 – Cameroon
Hyllus albomarginatus (Lenz, 1886) – Madagascar
Hyllus albooculatus (Vinson, 1863) – Madagascar
Hyllus alboplagiatus Thorell, 1899 – Cameroon
Hyllus angustivulvus Caporiacco, 1940 – Ethiopia
Hyllus argyrotoxus Simon, 1902 – West, East, Southern Africa
Hyllus atroniveus Caporiacco, 1940 – Ethiopia
Hyllus aubryi (Lucas, 1858) – Gabon
Hyllus bifasciatus Ono, 1993 – Madagascar
Hyllus bos (Sundevall, 1833) – India
Hyllus brevitarsis Simon, 1902 – Africa
Hyllus congoensis Lessert, 1927 – Ivory Coast, Congo
Hyllus cornutus (Blackwall, 1866) – Africa
Hyllus decellei Wanless & Clark, 1975 – Ivory Coast
Hyllus decoratus Thorell, 1887 – Myanmar
Hyllus deyrollei (Lucas, 1858) – Gabon, Ivory Coast
Hyllus diardi (Walckenaer, 1837) – India, Myanmar, Thailand, Laos, China to Indonesia (Java) 
Hyllus dotatus (Peckham & Peckham, 1903) – Sudan to Southern Africa, Yemen
Hyllus duplicidentatus Caporiacco, 1941 – Ethiopia
Hyllus flavescens Simon, 1902 – South Africa
Hyllus giganteus C. L. Koch, 1846 – Sumatra to Australia
Hyllus gulosus (Simon, 1877) – Philippines
Hyllus holochalceus Simon, 1910 – Bioko
Hyllus ignotus Wesołowska & Russell-Smith, 2022 – Ivory Coast
Hyllus interrogationis (Strand, 1907) – Madagascar
Hyllus jallae Pavesi, 1897 – Africa
Hyllus juanensis Strand, 1907 – Mozambique
Hyllus keratodes (Hasselt, 1882) – Sumatra
Hyllus leucomelas (Lucas, 1858) – West, Central Africa
Hyllus longiusculus (Thorell, 1899) – Cameroon
Hyllus lugubris (Vinson, 1863) – Madagascar
Hyllus lwoffi Berland & Millot, 1941 – Guinea, Ivory Coast
Hyllus madagascariensis (Vinson, 1863) – Madagascar
Hyllus manu John T. D. Caleb, Christudhas A., Laltanpuii, K. & Chitra, M, 2014 – Chennai
Hyllus maskaranus Barrion & Litsinger, 1995 – Philippines
Hyllus minahassae Merian, 1911 – Sulawesi
Hyllus mniszechi (Lucas, 1858) – Gabon
Hyllus multiaculeatus Caporiacco, 1949 – Kenya
Hyllus nebulosus Peckham & Peckham, 1907 – Borneo
Hyllus nigeriensis (Wesołowska & Edwards, 2012) – Nigeria
Hyllus nummularis (Gerstäcker, 1873) – Zanzibar
Hyllus peckhamorum Berland & Millot, 1941 – Ivory Coast
Hyllus plexippoides Simon, 1906 – Ivory Coast to Egypt
Hyllus pudicus Thorell, 1895 – India, Myanmar
Hyllus pulcherrimus Peckham & Peckham, 1907 – Borneo
Hyllus qishuoi Xiong, Liu & Zhang, 2017 – China
Hyllus ramadanii (Wesołowska & Russell-Smith, 2000) – Tanzania
Hyllus remotus Wesolowska & Russell-Smith, 2011 – Nigeria
Hyllus robinsoni Hogg, 1919 – Sumatra
Hyllus rotundithorax Wesolowska & Russell-Smith, 2000 – Tanzania
Hyllus sansibaricus Roewer, 1951 – Zanzibar
Hyllus semicupreus (Simon, 1885) – India, Sri Lanka
Hyllus senegalensis (C. L. Koch, 1846) – Senegal
Hyllus shanhonghani Lin & Li, 2022 – China
Hyllus solus Wesołowska & Russell-Smith, 2022 – Ivory Coast
Hyllus stigmatias (L. Koch, 1875) – Ethiopia
Hyllus suillus Thorell, 1899 – Cameroon
Hyllus thoracicus (Thorell, 1899) – Cameroon
Hyllus treleaveni Peckham & Peckham, 1902 – Central, East, Southern Africa
Hyllus tuberculatus Wanless & Clark, 1975 – Ivory Coast
Hyllus unicolor Wesołowska & Russell-Smith, 2022 – Ivory Coast
Hyllus viduatus Caporiacco, 1940 – Ethiopia
Hyllus vinsoni (Peckham & Peckham, 1885) – Madagascar
Hyllus walckenaeri (White, 1846) – Borneo, Sulawesi

References

Further reading
 Logunov, D.V. (2001): New and poorly known species of the jumping spiders (Aranei: Salticidae) from Afghanistan, Iran and Crete. Arthropoda Selecta 10: 59–66.
 Caleb, J. T. D., Christudhas, A., Laltanpuii, K. & Chitra, M (2014): A new species of Hyllus from India
 Metzner, H. (1999): Die Springspinnen (Araneae, Salticidae) Griechenlands. Andrias 14: 1–279.

External links

 Pictures of Hyllus diardi
 Frontal view of H. diardi

Salticidae
Spiders of Africa
Spiders of Asia
Salticidae genera